British migration to Spain has resulted in Spain being home to one of the largest British-born populations outside the United Kingdom in the world, and the largest in Europe. Migration from the UK to Spain has increased rapidly since the late 1990s and the registered population of British nationals in Spain in 2014 was 297,229 (2014). After Brexit, in 2020 British nationals in Spain numbered 262,885.

Demographics

Population size
In 2014, the officially registered population of British nationals in Spain was 236,669 (2014) and 107,326 in 2001.

Population distribution
According to the data collected by the INE, the distribution of Britons in Spain in 2005 was as follows:

Social issues
Research has shown that most of the British population in Spain is poorly socially integrated into Spanish society. A survey of 340 British migrants in the Province of Málaga, for example, found that one third rarely or never met Spanish people, apart from in shops and restaurants, and that 60 per cent did not speak Spanish well. A number of initiatives have been launched to improve integration of British migrants into Spanish life, including language course provision. As a result of the 2008 global financial crisis, some British people in Spain who want to return to the UK have been unable to do so because of the difficulty of selling property in a depressed local housing market. Figures published in January 2015 showed that 2,973 British nationals were in receipt of unemployment benefits in Spain, paid by the host country. In order to receive an unemployment benefit in Spain, a person must be legally unemployed after making unemployment contributions at least 360 days in the last six years and be registered with the employment authorities as available for work. The unemployment benefit is paid for a minimum of four months and maximum of 24 months, based on the period that the unemployed person has contributed.

Education
There are multiple British international schools located in Spain. The National Association of British Schools in Spain has 52 member schools.

See also 
 Demographics of Spain
 Spaniards in the United Kingdom
 British diaspora
 Predicted impact of Brexit
 Spain–United Kingdom relations

References

Further reading

External links
 Our work with schools - British Council Spain - About the council's work with British international schools in Spain

 
Spain
Ethnic groups in Spain